Muiriantha is a genus of plant containing the single species Muiriantha hassellii and is endemic to the south coast of Western Australia. It is a small shrub with branchlets covered sparsely in hairs, leathery leaves and yellowish-green pendulous flowers.

Description
The 5 yellowish-green petals are narrowly oblong to elliptic, rounded at the end, with a purple or green centre stripe, pedicels long and soft and weak hairs toward the petals apex. The spreading, dry fruit capsule ends in a sharp, short point. Flowering occurs from April to October.

Taxonomy and naming
Muiriantha hassellii was first formally described in 1887 by Ferdinand von Mueller, who gave it the name Chorilaena hassellii and published the description in the Victorian Naturalist. In 1933 Charles Austin Gardner  changed the name to Muiria hassellii, but the name Muiria was already used for a plant in the family Aizoaceae. In 1943 Gardner changed the name to Muiriantha hassellii in the Journal of the Royal Society of Western Australia. The specific epithet (hassellii) was named in honour of Albert Hassell who collected the plant from the west end of the Stirling Range.

Distribution and habitat
This species has a restricted distribution found only in the south-west of Western Australia at Mount Manypeaks and the Stirling Range on heath in peaty sand, rocky clay on hillsides.

References

hassellii
Monotypic Rutaceae genera
Zanthoxyloideae genera
Flora of Western Australia
Plants described in 1943
Taxa named by Charles Gardner
Taxa named by Ferdinand von Mueller